Maxo 187 (stylized as #Maxo187) is the third mixtape by the American rapper Maxo Kream. It was released on March 5, 2015, by TSO Records. The album's release was supported by the release of the single "Cell Boomin" featuring Father. The mixtape has guest appearances by Fredo Santana, Joey Bada$$ and others.

Production was led by Wolfe De Mçhls (also known as WXLF GXD) who produced six tracks, including album opener "Thirteen". A number of up-and-coming trap producers assisted him, including A$AP Mob member A$AP P on the boards, Ryan ESL and Christian Lou. The production was acclaimed for its cohesiveness and ability to complement Kream's versatile flow.
 
Noted by critics for its macabre themes and violent lyrics, #Maxo187 details Kream's teenage experiences in the drug-infested and crime-ridden streets of southwest Houston, told through accounts of home invasions, robberies and life as a 52 Hoover Gangster Crip. #Maxo187 received generally positive reviews from critics, who praised Kream's rapping and storytelling.

Music and lyrics

#Maxo187 uses atmospheric beats with rattling hi hats and booming bass, reminiscent of older Houstonian styles while still incorporating new styles of trap music, similar to Travis Scott's Days Before Rodeo and A$AP Rocky's LIVE.LOVE.A$AP. "Cell Boomin", the mixtape's lead single, is built around a simple sample of a phone ringing. The ringing tone's omnipresence seems haunting at times while Kream raps about shifty phone calls with dealers and his never-ending crusade in the drug trade. Album opener "Thirteen" begins with a sweeping synth build and a harrowing backing vocal which sounds as if the speaker is attempting to break through the mold of the volatile synthesizers. Later, a screaming synthline scatters freely across the track.

Singles
On February 27, 2015, Kream released the mixtape's lead single, "Cell Boomin". Later, the single appeared on Frank Ocean's curated playlist on Spotify, Blonded. In the Pitchfork Media review of the mixtape, the track was described as a "drug peddler anthem with [a] bouncing flow that explore[s] static thump[s] and a syrupy codeine haze."

Critical reception 

#Maxo187 was met with generally positive reviews from critics and rave reviews from listeners. The mixtape holds a 91% user rating on HotNewHipHop. Patrick Montes of Hypebeast Limited said the mixtape "might be his most fully-formed and developed project yet. From the bombastic, trap-on-steroids production of the intro track to the psychedelic graveyard music of “KKK” and the slow-churned, moody turn-up of "Astrodome," Maxo juxtaposes his ruthless cutthroat-raps with a variety of well-produced, quality beats on Maxo 187." Pitchfork Media called the record a "sinister and visceral portrait of Houston street life...Maxo 187 doesn't portray cripping as an escape from the hood but a liberation from ordinary life."

Track listing

References

2015 mixtape albums